Listening Woman is the third crime fiction novel in the Joe Leaphorn / Jim Chee Navajo Tribal Police series by Tony Hillerman, first published in 1978. The novel features Joe Leaphorn.

Pursuing what begins as a routine police call, Leaphorn is nearly killed by the driver of a car. He is then entangled in a tense hostage situation in the caves near the San Juan River.

The novel was nominated for the 1979 "Best Mystery Novel" Edgar Award. It was well-received as  "a compelling and often chilling book". and noted for "unselfconsciously drawing on the best of two clashing cultures."

Plot summary
After talking with Hosteen Tso to learn what will best improve his health, Margaret Cigaret walks away from the hogan on Nokaito Bench to ponder his situation and prepare her advice. She returns to find both Tso and her niece dead.  Initial investigation does not find the killer, or any possible motive for this crime.

Leaphorn is returning from a Kinaalda ceremony with a man who escaped arrest earlier. A car at very high speed approaches them, and slows seeing the police car’s flashing lights. Once Leaphorn is outside the car, the driver attempts to kill him with the vehicle, but Leaphorn moves away in time. The man wore gold rimmed glasses, had black hair and had a huge dog in the back seat. Leaphorn talks with Shorty McGinnis, where he meets Theodora Adams, who seeks Benjamin Tso. At the Tso hogan, Leaphorn observes Benjamin saying Catholic mass in the dawn. Later, Leaphorn returns to the Kinaalda to talk with Margaret Cigarette. He saw a name on a light carried by a boy there, which he realized was the name of the pilot of a helicopter lost in a dramatic theft of cash from an armored car in Santa Fe a few years earlier by members of the Buffalo Society, an extremist break-away group from AIM. The next step is a visit to the FBI office in Albuquerque to read the file for that case. He reads about Tull and Hoski, the latter a man of many aliases. While there, Leaphorn realizes that Mrs. Cigarette sat in a different spot than he originally assumed, one that meant the killer of Hosteen Tso and Annie came from the canyon, not the road. When that killer emerges from the canyon again, Father Benjamin and Theodora are the people who will be found in the hogan.

Leaphorn drives to the area of the hogan, parking on solid ground, then walking to the hogan. He does not find them there. Rain washed the tracks outside, but he sees large dog paw prints inside the hogan. Leaphorn spends a harrowing 30 hours in the caves of the canyon wall, escaping from the dog or the men who brought the dog. John Tull is one, and the other he knows as Gold Rims, for his eye glasses. He survives the dog, fire set to kill him, dynamite closing a cavern entrance, and long hours in total darkness. He manages to kill the dog, by letting it run over the edge of the upper cliff, though his first attempt to kill the dog lost him his service revolver. Walking through the connected caverns he realizes the caves are a hiding place for the men and they do not know he is still alive. He finds water to drink, realizing it is from Lake Powell. Then he hears voices. A man carries away some boxes from a cache of food, gasoline, a case of dynamite sticks, timers but no blasting caps. Leaphorn takes some food, over thirty hours since he ate. Then he plans his escape route, having found the cave’s mouth. His flash light and binoculars have been useful all this time.

Leaphorn encounters Father Benjamin Tso, arms and legs tied, who mentions his brother, one year older, raised separately – Gold Rims to Leaphorn. Gold Rims is part of the Buffalo Society and of the hostage event that Leaphorn heard mentioned on the police radio hours before. The Boy Scout hostages from an event in Canyon de Chelly are present in a caged area, where Theodora Adams is also held. Leaphorn unties Father Tso, who observes that both his brother and Tull are insane. Leaphorn follows Gold Rims and Tull. Leaphorn’s plan is that Father Tso will distract the next of the kidnappers to enter the cave, so that Leaphorn can take that man down. Waiting for that moment, Leaphorn finds the cave where Standing Medicine had left over thirty sand paintings for a special ceremony, a great gift to his people from over 100 years earlier. When the kidnapper arrives, Father Tso plays his role as he sees it, asking the man to give him the gun; the man shoots before Leaphorn can complete his ambush. Father Tso is dead. So is Jackie Noni, felled by Leaphorn’s well-aimed projectile. Leaphorn takes the shotgun, unlocks the cage around the hostages, telling them to disappear and tell no one of his presence, while he deals with John Tull. The caves have dynamite on timers, meant to kill the hostages, and the three from the Buffalo Society. But Father Benjamin’s body could do for his brother’s in the tally, as no one knows he was in the cave and Hoski / Jimmy Tso wants to leave alone for a new life with his girlfriend. Gold Rims is Hoski; he returns to the cave with the ransom cash and two boats. Tull is about to change a timer to blow up sooner, then two shots are heard and the dynamite kills them both. Leaphorn finds the boats, puts the money sack with the two dead men, and then gets all the hostages onto the boats and in the lake, away from the explosions. He shoots a gasoline can to make a signal fire, which draws an army helicopter. Leaphorn totes up the people killed by Hoski, and the motives for each murder. Theodora Adams asks why Father Tso put himself in fatal danger, which she will have to figure out herself. The gift of Standing Medicine is probably still intact, well protected in the dry cave.

Characters
 Joe Leaphorn: Lieutenant in the Navajo Tribal Police, police officer with a masters degree in anthropology.
 Anna Atcitty:  niece to Mrs. Cigaret, about 16 years old, learning from her aunt.
 Hosteen Tso: old Navajo man with illnesses, seeking his grandson; Tso is the great grandson of the famous Navajo Standing Medicine, lost in the era of Kit Carson leading the army to annihilate the Navajo people, in the Long Walk of the Navajo.
 Mrs. Margaret Cigarette, the Listening Woman: blind older woman who knows the sings to help specific problems.
 Captain Largo: Navajo Tribal Police captain based in Tuba City, who directs Leaphorn as to responsibility for the safety of Theodora Adams, who the Navajo Police are asked to keep safe.
 Emerson Begay: escaped prisoner taken at Kinaalda ceremony by Leaphorn, then got away again when a driver tried to kill Leaphorn with a speeding car.
 John "Shorty" McGinnis: owner of Short Mountain Trading Post for the last forty years.
 Theodora Adams: young woman from Washington, D.C. who pursues Father Benjamin Tso.
 Benjamin Tso: Catholic priest in Franciscan order, grandson to Hosteen Tso. He is motivated to help his people by living among them as a priest.
 Jimmy (James) Tso: wayward grandson of Hosteen Tso; older brother of Father Benjamin, Gold Rims to Leaphorn, and Hoski to the police long tracking him. As first born son, he learned of the secret cave and the gift of Standing Medicine. He is driven to help his people through the violence of the Buffalo Society.
 Hoski: another man in the Santa Fe robbery, of many aliases known to the FBI, born as James Tso, older brother of Father Benjamin Tso, but the two were raised in separate homes. Under surveillance, fooled the FBI surveillance by changing clothes with an accomplice in a laundromat, and left his Washington DC home for the caves near his grandfather's hogan.
Rosemary Rita Ovileras: Woman in Washington DC with whom Hoski fell in love, unexpectedly to him. That love changes his plans.
 George Witover: FBI agent in Albuquerque who is eager to resolve several cases following from a robbery of an armored car in Santa Fe a few years earlier.
 Alice Endischee: hosting the Kinaalda, where Leaphorn speaks directly with Margaret Cigarette.
 John Tull: member of the Buffalo Society who blew off the back of an armored car to steal the money in Santa Fe; released on bail a few weeks before Leaphorn was attacked; he is easy to identify because of a childhood accident that damaged one side of his face. He is a Seminole man.
Jackie Noni: first approached McGinnis to buy his Trading Post, which offer was rejected; member of the Buffalo Society, at the caves with the kidnapped Boy Scouts; a Pottawatomie man.
 Frederick Lynch: owner of the Mercedes auto stolen by Hoski from Washington D.C., and another of Hoski's murder victims; first considered to be the driver of the vehicle on the reservation, and thus Gold Rims.

Geography
In his 2011 book Tony Hillerman's Navajoland: Hideouts, Haunts, and Havens in the Joe Leaphorn and Jim Chee Mysteries, author  has listed the following 28 geographical locations, real and fictional, mentioned in Listening Woman. 

Albuquerque, NM
Beautiful Mountain, NM
Canyon De Chelly (National Monument),AZ
Cow Springs (Trading Post), AZ
Farmington, NM
Flagstaff, AZ
Gallup, NM
Glen Canyon, AZ
Kayenta, AZ
Lake Powell, UT & AZ
Manki Canyon (fictitious canyon)
Many Farms, AZ
Mexican Water (Trading Post), AZ
Navajo Mountain, UT & AZ
Nokaito Bench, UT
Rainbow Plateau, AZ
San Francisco Peaks, AZ
San Juan River, CO, NM, & UT
Santa Fe, NM
Shiprock (Community), NM
Short Mountain Trading Post (fictitious location)
 Spider Rock, AZ (landform at Canyon de Chelly National Monument)
Teec Nos Pos, AZ
Toadlena, NM
Tuba City, AZ
Two Grey Hills, NM
Window Rock, AZ
Yazzie Springs (fictitious location)

Reception
The novel was well received, with author Marcia Muller stating that "his stark depiction of the New Mexico landscape is particularly fine" and that she found the work to be "a compelling and often chilling book". The novel was also nominated for the 1979 "Best Mystery Novel" Edgar Award.

Kirkus Reviews finds it a satisfying novel:
Like so many other mystery men these days, the splendid Mr. Hillerman has allowed his detective, Joe Leaphorn of the Navajo Police, to get tangled up with terrorists: a Boy Scout troop is held hostage by a fringe Indian-rights gang whose leader is a madman out for revenge and personal gain. But never mind. The plots out at Monument Valley Navajo Tribal Park ("this whole Short Mountain country ain't worth hitting a man with a stick for") have never been Hillerman's magic. That comes instead from his unhokey Indian population, convincingly mystical (sand paintings and ritual cures play key roles here) but alive to modern ways and talk; from the contrast between highways and mountains, asphalt and rock; and from the quiet, wise presence of Leaphorn himself, unselfconsciously drawing on the best of two clashing cultures. With enough action (Joe survives a fife[sic] ordeal) and last-second twists to grab those uninterested in the topnotch atmosphere, Hillman's overdue return (five years since Dance Hall of the Dead) should draw murmurs of contentment from all sides.

Development of novel
Author Tony Hillerman remarked about this book that 
TH: This book taught me that inability to outline a plot has advantages. The plan was to use Monster Slayer and Born for Water, the hero twins of the Navajo Genesis story, in a mystery involving orphaned brothers (a “spoiled priest” and a militant radical) who collide in their campaigns to help their people. I would use a shaman, the last person to talk to my murder victim before he is killed, as a source for religious information meaningless to the FBI but revealing to Leaphorn. After a series of first chapters that led nowhere, I wrote a second chapter in which Leaphorn stops the villain for speeding and, more or less out of whimsy, I have him see a big ugly dog in the backseat of the car, intending to use the delete key on my new (and first) computer to delete said dog later. That unoutlined dog became crucial to the plot. No more trying to outline.

Allusions to real events and persons

Standing Medicine, the great grandfather to Hosteen Tso, is said to have died after the Long Walk of the Navajo, an event that occurred in the 1860s.

Allusions to Literature

When Lt. Leaphorn speaks with FBI agent George Witover, Witover mentions that his colleague John O'Malley spoke well of Leaphorn. This is a reference to the prior novel, Dance Hall of the Dead, where John O'Malley was lead for the FBI involvement of the case; O'Malley considers the case still open, where Leaphorn considers it closed, and is sure that O'Malley has few good feelings about him. Leaphorn and Witover, by contrast, have a more effective collaboration in this novel.

Publication history

1978, Harper & Row, hardback

References

Bibliography

External links
Listening Woman at the Tony Hillerman Portal

1978 American novels
Novels by Tony Hillerman
Harper & Row books
Novels set in Arizona
Novels set in New Mexico